The 8th Cannes Film Festival was held from 26 April to 10 May 1955. The Golden Palm went to the US film Marty by Delbert Mann. The festival opened with Du rififi chez les hommes by Jules Dassin and closed with Carmen Jones by Otto Preminger.

Until the 1954 Festival, the whimsical way various prizes were being awarded had drawn much criticism. In answer to this, from 1955 onwards, the Jury was composed of foreign celebrities from the film industry. In 1955, the first Palme d'Or was awarded, as the highest prize of the Festival.

Jury

The following people were appointed as the Jury of the 1955 competition:

Feature films
Marcel Pagnol (France) Jury President
Marcel Achard (France)
Juan Antonio Bardem (Spain)
A. Dignimont (France)
Jacques-Pierre Frogerais (France)
Leopold Lindtberg (Switzerland)
Anatole Litvak (USA)
Isa Miranda (Italy)
Leonard Mosley (UK)
Jean Nery (France)
Sergei Yutkevich (Soviet Union)
Short films
Jacques Doniol-Valcroze (France)
Herman van der Horst (Netherlands)
Marcel Ichac (France)
Karl Korn (West Germany)
Jean Perdrix (France)

Feature film competition
The following feature films competed for the Palme d'Or:

Bad Day at Black Rock by John Sturges
Biraj Bahu by Bimal Roy
A Big Family (Bolshaya Semya) by Iosif Kheifits
Black Dossier (Le Dossier noir) by André Cayatte
Boot Polish by Prakash Arora
Carmen Jones by Otto Preminger
The Crucified Lovers (Chikamatsu Monogatari) by Kenji Mizoguchi
The Country Girl by George Seaton
Det brenner i natt! by Arne Skouen
Dog's Heads (Psohlavci) by Martin Frič
East of Eden by Elia Kazan
The End of the Affair by Edward Dmytryk
Un extraño en la escalera by Tulio Demicheli
The Gold of Naples (L'oro di Napoli) by Vittorio De Sica
Heroes of Shipka (Geroite na Shipka) by Sergei Vasilyev
Hill 24 Doesn't Answer (Giv'a 24 Eina Ona) by Thorold Dickinson
Jedda by Charles Chauvel
A Kid for Two Farthings by Carol Reed
Life or Death (Hayat ou maut) by Kamal El Sheikh
Liliomfi by Károly Makk
Lost Continent (Continente perduto) by Leonardo Bonzi, Mario Craveri, Enrico Gras, Angelo Francesco Lavagnino and Giorgio Moser
 Ludwig II by Helmut Käutner
Marty by Delbert Mann
The Miracle of Marcelino (Marcelino pan y vino) by Ladislao Vajda
Die Mücke by Walter Reisch
Onna no koyomi by Seiji Hisamatsu
Rififi (Du rififi chez les hommes) by Jules Dassin
Romeo and Juliet (Romeo i Dzhulyetta) by Lev Arnshtam and Leonid Lavrovsky
Roots (Raíces) by Benito Alazraki
Samba Fantástico by Jean Manzon and René Persin
Senhime by Keigo Kimura
The Sign of Venus (Il segno di Venere) by Dino Risi
Stella by Michael Cacoyannis

Films out of competition
The following films were selected to be screened out of competition:
 Italia K2 by Marcello Balbi
 Les trésors de la Mer Rouge by Michel Rocca

Short film competition
The following short films competed for the Short Film Palme d'Or:

 2'21"6 Butterfly Stroke: Dolphin-Kick by T. Mijata
 A esperanca e' eterna by Marcos Margulies
 Aggtelek by Ágoston Kollányi
 Arte popular Portuguesa by João Mendes
 Black on White by John Read 
 Blinkity Blank by Norman McLaren
 Bow Bells by Anthony Simmons
 Bronsalder by Lars Krantz
 Bush Doctor by Jean Palardy
 Cyrk by Włodzimierz Haupe
 De sable et de feu by Jean Jabely
 Den standhaftige Tinnsoldat by Ivo Caprino
 Der Schatz des Abendlandes by Ernst Stephan Niessner, Edmund Von Hammer
 Dobreho vojak svejk by Jiri Trnka
 Dock by Emile Degelin
 Guardians of the Soil by David Millin
 Host by Thor Arnijot Udvang, Carsten Munch
 Images préhistoriques by Arcady & Thomas L. Rowe
 In cantec si dans by Ion Bostan
 Isole di fuoco by Vittorio De Seta
 Jakten over sporene by Erik Borge
 L'homme dans la lumière by René Lucot
 La ciudad blanca by Waldo Cerruto
 La grande pèche by Henri Fabiani
 Le conte de ma vie by Jørgen Roos
 Les jardiniers d'Allah by Michel Clarence
 Niedzielny poranek by Andrzej Munk
 Nos forets by Auguste Kern
 Op de spitsen by Rudi Hornecker
 Opici cisar by Jan Lacko
 Island of Sakhalin (Ostrov Sakhalin) by Vassili Katanian, Eldar Ryazanov
 Pierre Romain desfossez by Gérard De Boe
 Pulsschlag der Zeit by René Boeniger
 Symphony of Life by T.A. Abraham
 The Golden River by Pittamandalam Venktatachalapathy Pathy
 The Story of Light by Joop Geesink
 Tickets Please by Emil Nofal
 Trois coquillages de Tunisie by Roger Mauge
 When Magoo Flew by Pete Burness
 Zolotaya antilopa by Lev Atamanov

Awards

Official awards
The following films and people received the 1955 awards:
Palme d'Or: Marty by Delbert Mann
Best Director:
Jules Dassin for Rififi (Du rififi chez les hommes)
Sergei Vasilyev for Heroes of Shipka (Geroite na Shipka)
 Tribute: Hill 24 Doesn't Answer (Giv'a 24 Eina Ona) by Thorold Dickinson
 Best Acting Award: (in 1955 and 1956 this award was given without gender differentiation)
Spencer Tracy for Bad Day at Black Rock
 The entire male and female cast of A Big Family for their performances  
Jury Special Prize: Lost Continent by Leonardo Bonzi, Mario Craveri, Enrico Gras, Angelo Francesco Lavagnino and Giorgio Moser
Best Dramatic Film: East of Eden by Elia Kazan
Best Lyrical Film: Romeo and Juliet (Romeo i Dzhulyetta) by Lev Arnshtam and Leonid Lavrovsky
Distinction to two children:
Kumari Naaz for her child actress performance in Boot Polish
Pablito Calvo for his child actor performance in Marcelino pan y vino
Short films
Short Film Palme d'Or: Blinkity Blank by Norman McLaren
Special Distinction: Zolotaya Antilopa by Lev Atamanov
Best Short Documentary: Isole di fuoco by Vittorio De Seta
Prix du reportage filmé: La grande pêche by Henri Fabiani

Independent awards
FIPRESCI Prize
Death of a Cyclist (Muerte de un ciclista) by Juan Antonio Bardem
Roots by Benito Alazraki
OCIC Award
Marty by Delbert Mann
Special Mention: The Miracle of Marcelino (Marcelino pan y vino) by Ladislao Vajda

References

Media
Institut National de l'Audiovisuel: Opening of the 1955 Festival (commentary in French)
INA: Last moments of the 1955 festival (commentary in French)

External links
1955 Cannes Film Festival (web.archive)
Official website Retrospective 1955 
Cannes Film Festival Awards for 1955 at Internet Movie Database

Cannes Film Festival, 1955
Cannes Film Festival, 1955
Cannes Film Festival